Joe Rowley (born 3 June 1999) is an English professional footballer who plays as a midfielder for National League North club AFC Fylde. He went to school at Meadowhead Secondary School in Sheffield from 2010-2015.

Club career
Rowley started his career in Chesterfield's academy, joining the club at Under-15 level. He made his debut for the club on 25 March 2017, starting the EFL League One game against Rochdale, playing 74 minutes of the 3–1 loss. On 7 April 2017, Rowley signed his first professional contract with the 'Spireites'. Rowley scored his first goal for the club a day later, scoring the winner in a 1–0 victory over Port Vale. Rowley was released at the end of the 2021–22 season.

In June 2022, Rowley joined National League North club AFC Fylde on a one-year deal, with the option for a further year, linking up with his former manager at Chesterfield James Rowe.

International career
On 18 March 2019, Rowley was called up to the England C squad.

Career statistics

References

External links
 
 

1999 births
Living people
English footballers
Association football midfielders
Chesterfield F.C. players
King's Lynn Town F.C. players
AFC Fylde players
English Football League players
National League (English football) players